Steve Funnell (born 28 November 1965) is an Australian former rugby league footballer who played in the 1980s and 1990s.

Playing career
A former Saints junior, Funnell was a fullback for St. George for five seasons between 1984-88. He was a reserve in the 1985 Grand Final but didn't retain a first grade spot on a regular basis during his time at the Dragons.

Funnell decided to change clubs in 1989, joining Western Suburbs, and finished his career at Eastern Suburbs in 1992.

Funnell captain-coached Adelong-Batlow to the 1996 Group 9 premiership.

References

St. George Dragons players
Western Suburbs Magpies players
Sydney Roosters players
Australian rugby league players
1965 births
Living people
Rugby league fullbacks
Rugby league players from Sydney